The 4th Supreme People's Assembly (SPA) was elected on 25 November 1967 and convened for its first session on 14–16 December 1967. It was replaced on 25 December 1972 by the 5th Supreme People's Assembly.

Meetings

Officers

Chairman

Vice Chairman

Deputies

References

Citations

Bibliography
Books:
 
  
 

4th Supreme People's Assembly
1967 establishments in North Korea
1972 disestablishments in North Korea